Kozlovka is a rural locality (a village) in Krasnopolyanskoye Rural Settlement, Nikolsky District, Vologda Oblast, Russia. The population was 116 as of 2002.

Geography 
Kozlovka is located 15 km southeast of Nikolsk (the district's administrative centre) by road. Plaksino is the nearest rural locality.

References 

Rural localities in Nikolsky District, Vologda Oblast